Hervé Harant (born September 2, 1901 in Paulhan, Hérault–1986, Montpellier) was a French physician
parasitologist and zoologist. He was professor of natural history, parasitology, and exotic pathology at the University of Montpellier
medical school. From 1976 he was director of the Jardin des plantes de Montpellier.

Works
partial list 
dissertation 1929 in Montpellier on hirudineans) (doctorat en médecine University of Montpellier) 
dissertation 1931 in Paris on ascidians and their parasites (doctorat ès sciences naturelles en Sorbonne) 
with Paulette Vernières - Faune de France Volume n° 27 (1901-1986) Tuniciers I, 1933 
with Paulette Vernières - Faune de France Volume n° 33 - Tuniciers II : Appendiculaires et Thaliacés, 1938, 60 p
with Paulette Vernières - Tuniciers pélagiques provenant des croisières du prince Albert Ier de Monaco Monaco : Impr. de Monaco, 1934.
With Daniel Jarry Guide du naturaliste dans le midi de la France'' Neuchâtel, Delachaux & Niestlé 1961-1963 : tome 1: La mer -Le littoral, tome 2: La garrigue, le maquis, les cultures

References
Persee

20th-century French zoologists
1986 deaths
1901 births